Lachnocnema tanzaniensis is a butterfly in the family Lycaenidae. It is found in western and south-western Tanzania.

References

Endemic fauna of Tanzania
Butterflies described in 1996
Taxa named by Michel Libert
Miletinae